Amos Ferguson (February 28, 1920 – October 19, 2009) was a Bahamian folk artist.

Life 
Amos Ferguson was a Bahamian folk artist who is known for his brilliantly colored Bible stories and Bahamian scenes.

Amos Ferguson was born in Exuma on February 28, 1920. His father was a preacher and farmer. He worked as an upholsterer, furniture finisher, artist and house painter.

He died in Nassau on October 19, 2009.

Work 
Ferguson was known for his brilliantly colored Bible stories and Bahamian scenes. Ferguson was a house painter by trade and did not become an artist until he was in his 40s. As he told the story, his nephew came to him and related a dream that he had just had. Jesus, the nephew said, came out of the sea with the picture in his hands and said that Mr. Ferguson was wasting his talent in painting. Mr. Ferguson heeded the call and painting with exterior enamel on cardboard, rendered Bible stories or Bahamian stories in Caribbean visual idiom.

He began showing at Bahamian galleries in 1972. Widespread recognition came to him in 1978 when Sukie Miller, an American collector, bought some of his paintings. His art debuted in the U.S. with a 1985 exhibition at the Wadsworth Atheneum, which featured 50 of his paintings. His images were later used to illustrate "Under the Sunday Tree" (1991), a collection of poetry by Eloise Greenfield. Ferguson's official Art Gallery is located in Nassau, Bahamas. He often titled his paintings using poor grammar and misspellings. He always signed his paintings with the phrase "Paint by Mr. Amos Ferguson".

Amos Ferguson wasn't trained as an artist and was known as an outsider artist. He often said "I paint by faith, not by sight". His paintings, which sell for as much as $45,000, are displayed in galleries in the Bahamas, the United States, and homes, museums, and art galleries around the world. In 2005 the street where he lived in Nassau was renamed Amos Ferguson Street.

References

 The Nassau Guardian
 The [Bahamas] Tribune
 The New York Times
 Dr. Gail Saunders, Bahamas
 The National Art Gallery of The Bahamas
 The Harry C. Moore Library & Information Centre, College of the Bahamas
 The Official website of Amos Ferguson
 The Amos Ferguson Official Gallery, The Bahamas

Bahamian artists
House painters
People from Exuma
1920 births
2009 deaths